Cavalli si nasce is a 1988 Italian comedy film written and directed by cartoonist Sergio Staino. The film won the  Silver Ribbon for Best Score.

Cast 

Paolo Hendel: Paolo
David Riondino: Ottavio
Pietra Montecorvino: Carola
Vincent Gardenia: Neapolitan Prince  
Delia Boccardo: Baroness 
Giacomo Marramao: Padre Giacomo
Franco Angrisano
Beniamino Placido 
Roberto Murolo
 Bonvi

References

External links

1988 films
Italian comedy films
1988 comedy films
1988 directorial debut films
1980s Italian-language films
1980s Italian films